Yaa Avoe  (born 1 July 1982) is a Ghanaian women's international footballer who plays as a defender. She is a member of the Ghana women's national football team. She was part of the team at the 2003 FIFA Women's World Cup and 2007 FIFA Women's World Cup. On club level she plays for Ash Town Ladies in Ghana.

References

1982 births
Living people
Ghanaian women's footballers
Ghana women's international footballers
Place of birth missing (living people)
2003 FIFA Women's World Cup players
2007 FIFA Women's World Cup players
Women's association football defenders